Konstantinos Provydakis (born 21 May 1996) is a Greek professional footballer who plays as a right-back for Super League 2 club Kifisia, on loan from Lamia.

References

1996 births
Living people
Gamma Ethniki players
Football League (Greece) players
Super League Greece 2 players
Super League Greece players
Irodotos FC players
Ergotelis F.C. players
PAS Lamia 1964 players
Association football defenders
Footballers from Heraklion
Greek footballers